Djallon-Foula is a rural commune in the Cercle of Yanfolila in the Sikasso Region of southern Mali. The commune covers an area of 471 square kilometers and includes eight villages. In the 2009 census it had a population of 10,678. The village of Guélélinkoro, the administrative center (chef-lieu) of the commune, is 40 km west of Yanfolila and 4 km east of the Sankarani River that marks the border of Mali with Guinea.

References

External links
.

Communes of Sikasso Region